Mountain alder is a common name for two different alders:

Alnus alnobetula subsp. crispa — the green alder, native to western North America.
Alnus incana subsp. tenuifolia — the grey alder or thinleaf alder, native to western North America.